Ferrell is an unincorporated community located within Elk Township, in Gloucester County, New Jersey, United States. It was named after Thomas M. Ferrell of Glassboro, a well-known politician in the area. The community of Ferrell was originally known as Fairview, but was changed to its current name as soon as the post office was established, due to an already existing Fairview.

References

External links 

 History of Ferrell, New Jersey

Elk Township, New Jersey
Unincorporated communities in Gloucester County, New Jersey
Unincorporated communities in New Jersey